For 1989 in television, see:

1989 in American television
1989 in Australian television
1989 in Austrian television
1989 in Belgian television
1989 in Brazilian television
1989 in British television
1989 in Canadian television
1989 in Croatian television
1989 in Danish television
1989 in Dutch television
1989 in Estonian television
1989 in French television
1989 in German television
1989 in Indonesian television
1989 in Irish television
1989 in Israeli television
1989 in Japanese television
1989 in Mexican television
1989 in New Zealand television
1989 in Norwegian television
1989 in Philippine television
1989 in Portuguese television
1989 in Scottish television
1989 in Singapore television
1989 in South African television
1989 in Swedish television